This is a list of films which ranked number one at the weekend box office for the year 2023.

Number-one films

Highest-grossing films

In-Year Release

See also
 Lists of American films — American films by year
 Lists of box office number-one films

References

2023 in American cinema
2023
United States